Resha is an Egyptian surname. Notable people with the surname include:

Maggie Resha (1923–2003), South African nurse and dissident, wife of Robert
Robert Resha (1920–1973), South African journalist and dissident

See also
 Resha (disambiguation)